William Armstrong Henry (6 September 1884 — after 1960) was a Scottish professional footballer who played as a right back for Rangers, Falkirk, Leicester City and Manchester City.

Career
Henry was born in Glasgow and began his football career in Scotland with Rangers and then Falkirk before transferring to Leicester City in England in September 1909. He played 96 times for Leicester before Manchester City purchased him for £1,000 in 1911, the highest fee that Leicester City had received for one of their players at the time. He made his Manchester City debut in a 1–1 draw against Sunderland in November 1911. He went on to make 157 appearances for Manchester City in which he scored one goal. The war hindered his outings for City but he did spend eight years there, the majority of his career. He never got a first-team cap for Scotland, but did get international honours in a military game between England and Scotland at Everton's Goodison Park ground.

Personal life 
Henry served in the 5th Cavalry Reserve Regiment during the First World War.

References

Scottish footballers
Rangers F.C. players
Falkirk F.C. players
Leicester City F.C. players
Manchester City F.C. players
English Football League players
1884 births
Year of death missing
Scotland wartime international footballers
Scottish Football League players
Footballers from Glasgow
Blantyre Victoria F.C. players
St Bernard's F.C. players
Association football fullbacks
British Army personnel of World War I
Scottish Junior Football Association players